The willow ptarmigan (Lagopus lagopus) is a bird in the grouse subfamily Tetraoninae of the pheasant family Phasianidae. It is also known as the willow grouse and in Ireland and Britain, where the subspecies L. l. scotica was previously considered to be a separate species, as the red grouse. It breeds in birch and other forests and moorlands in northern Europe, the tundra of Scandinavia, Siberia, Alaska and Canada, in particular in the provinces of Newfoundland and Labrador and Quebec. It is the state bird of Alaska. In the summer the birds are largely brown, with dappled plumage, but in the winter they are white with some black feathers in their tails (British populations do not adopt a winter plumage). The species has remained little changed from the bird that roamed the tundra during the Pleistocene. Nesting takes place in the spring when clutches of four to ten eggs are laid in a scrape on the ground. The chicks are precocial and soon leave the nest. While they are young, both parents play a part in caring for them. The chicks eat insects and young plant growth while the adults are completely herbivorous, eating leaves, flowers, buds, seeds and berries during the summer and largely subsisting on the buds and twigs of willow and other dwarf shrubs and trees during the winter.

Description 

The willow ptarmigan is a medium to large ground-dwelling bird and is the most numerous of the three species of ptarmigan. It is deep-chested and has a fairly long neck, a broad bill, short feathered legs and a moderately short rounded tail. In the summer, the male's plumage is marbled brown, with a reddish hue to the neck and breast, a black tail and white wings and underparts. It has a red semicircular comb above each eye, which become red and prominent in the breeding season. The female is similar in appearance but with much smaller eye combs and has brown feathers scattered among the white feathers on her belly. During winter, the body plumage and two central tail feathers of both sexes becomes completely white, except for the black outer rectrices. Their wing feathers remain white all year round. Immature birds resemble the adults.

The willow ptarmigan can be distinguished from the closely related rock ptarmigan (Lagopus muta) by its larger size and thicker bill and by the fact that it is not generally found above the tree line while the rock ptarmigan prefers more elevated, barren habitat. The summer plumage is browner and in the winter, the male willow ptarmigan lacks the rock ptarmigan's black stripe between the eyes and bill. The white-tailed ptarmigan (Lagopus leucura) in North America is smaller, has a white tail and finely-barred greyer plumage and lives permanently above the tree line. The distinctive British Isles subspecies L. l. scoticus (red grouse) was once considered a separate true British species but is now classified as a sub-species. This moorland bird is reddish brown all over, except for its white feet.

The voice is low-pitched and guttural and includes chuckles, repeated clucking sounds, and expostulations. When displaying, the male makes rattles and barking noises.

Taxonomy and systematics

The willow ptarmigan's scientific name, Lagopus lagopus is derived from Ancient Greek  'hare' +  'foot', in reference to the bird's feathered feet which allow it to negotiate frozen ground.

Subspecies
The willow ptarmigan has 16 recognized subspecies. Most differ little in appearance, though the red grouse (L. l. scoticus) is rather distinct. The taxonomy is confused, partly because of the complicated changes in plumage several times a year and the differing color and pattern of the summer plumage:

 L. l. alascensis (Swarth, 1926) - Alaska
 L. l. alba (Gmelin & JF, 1789) - Northern Canada
 L. l. alexandrae (Grinnell, 1909)  - Alaska and British Columbia
 L. l. alleni (Stejneger, 1884) - Newfoundland
 L. l. brevirostris (Hesse, 1912) - Altai Mountains and Sayan Mountains
 L. l. koreni (Thayer & Bangs, 1914) - Siberia to Kamchatka peninsula 
 L. l. kozlowae (Portenko, 1931) - northern Mongolia and southern Siberia
 L. l. lagopus (Linnaeus, 1758) - Scandinavia, Finland, and northern Russia
 L. l. leucoptera (Taverner, 1932) - Northernmost Canada and its Arctic islands
 L. l. maior (Lorenz T, 1904) - north Kazakhstan and southwest Siberia
 L. l. okadai (Momiyama, 1928) - Sakhalin Island
 L. l. rossica (Serebrovski, 1926) - Baltic states and central Russia
 L. l. scotica (Latham, 1787) - Britain and Ireland
 L. l. sserebrowsky (Domaniewski, 1933) - Northeastern Mongolia to southeast Siberia and northeastern China
 L. l. ungavus (Riley, 1911) - Northeastern Canada
 L. l. variegata (Salomonsen, 1936) - Trondheim, Norway

The willow ptarmigan often hybridises with the black grouse (Tetrao tetrix) and the hazel grouse (Tetrastes bonasia) and occasionally with the western capercaillie (Tetrao urogallus), the spruce grouse (Falcipennis canadensis) and the rock ptarmigan (Lagopus muta).

During the Pleistocene, the willow ptarmigan widely occurred in continental Europe. Authors who recognize paleosubspecies have named the Pleistocene willow ptarmigan L. l. noaillensis (though the older name medius might be the correct one). These marginally different birds are said to have gradually changed from the earlier (Pliocene) Lagopus atavus into the present-day species L. lagopus. Pleistocene willow ptarmigan are recorded from diverse sites until the end of the Vistulian glaciation about 10,000 years ago, when the species, by then all but identical with the living birds, retreated northwards with its tundra habitat.

Distribution and habitat
The willow ptarmigan has a circum-boreal distribution. It is native to Canada and the United States, China, Mongolia, the Russian Federation, Kazakhstan, the Czech Republic, Finland, Norway, Sweden, Estonia, Latvia, Lithuania, Germany, the United Kingdom and Ireland. It primarily occupies subalpine and subarctic habitats such as sparse pine and birch forests, thickets with willow and alder trees, heather moors, tundra and mountain slopes. In the winter, females and sub-adults may move to lower altitudes and seek shelter in valleys or in more densely vegetated areas, but adult males usually remain in the subalpine region. The red grouse is common on heather-clad moorland across the north and west of Great Britain and in localised areas of Ireland.

Diet

The willow ptarmigan has a varied and seasonal diet. The bird is herbivorous for most of its life and subsists on various plant materials. As juveniles, they may feed on insects due to an inability to digest plant material caused by underdeveloped cecums. In the summer, their diet is highly varied and may consist of berries, flowers, leaves, twigs and seeds.

In Alaska, the main dietary item of the adults at all times of year is willows such as the Alaska willow Salix alaxensis, with leaves being eaten in summer and buds, twigs and catkins supplying the birds' main nutritional needs in winter and early spring. In the early twenty-first century, there has been an increase in shrub expansion in arctic Alaska that is thought to be greatly affecting the willow ptarmigan's winter diet. Because of the way they browse, Ptarmigan help shape the landscape of the area. After heavy snowfalls, the birds cannot access the shorter shrubs as they are blanketed with snow, so they will eat the taller species that poke through. In one study it was found that 90% of the buds of the Alaska willow within their reach had been browsed. This will stunt the willows and create a feedback cycle extending through the entire ecosystem. However, in winters with below average snowfall, the browsing of Ptarmigans will not have such a drastic effect as their feeding will be spread out across a range of lower plant species. It is also believed that the greening of parts of the Arctic is affecting Willow Ptarmigan populations by altering the shape and size of the shrubs they are able to feed on.

Behavior 
Male willow ptarmigans are territorial birds. Males arrive in the breeding areas and set up territories in April and May, aggressively defending them against male interlopers. When the females arrive a few weeks later, the male performs courtship displays such as aerial manoeuvres, strutting and tail-fanning. When she has chosen a mate and a nesting site, the female lays a clutch of six to ten eggs in a shallow depression on the ground. The nest site is usually in a hidden location at the edge of a clearing.

A small minority of male willow ptarmigan are polygynous but most are monogamous. They are assiduous at guarding both nest and mate, particularly early in the incubation period and when the eggs are nearly ready to hatch. During this time, the greatest danger may be from conspecifics. Although adult willow ptarmigans are herbivores, the newly hatched young also feed on insects. In most other species of grouse, only the female takes care of the young, but the male willow ptarmigan also helps with feeding the brood and protecting them. He may take over completely if the female dies. In particular, the male defends the young from predators and both he and his mate can dive-bomb intruders or lure attackers away by pretending to have a broken wing. Nevertheless, the chicks face many dangers which range from attacks by foxes or birds of prey, getting separated from the rest of the brood, bad weather and coccidiosis. Fewer than 35% of chicks survive to eleven months and only a minority of these reach maturity. Despite this, in favourable seasons, many juveniles may survive and the population of willow ptarmigan is prone to wide fluctuations in size. By September, families begin to form flocks. The females and young migrate to lower altitudes and may overwinter  from their breeding grounds in wooded valleys and hilly country. The males also congregate in small groups but do not usually travel as far as the females.

Cold adaptations 
The willow ptarmigan has several behavioral and physiological adaptations that help it survive the long Arctic winter, such as large pectoral muscles that aid in the process of shivering. Researchers have found that these pectoral muscles grow quickly during the first few days of the ptarmigan’s life, meaning that the ptarmigan chicks go from having no thermoregulatory ability at hatch to being able to maintain their normal body temperature for hours at 10 °C when they are two weeks old. The rapid increase in pectoralis size is caused by increases in muscle fiber diameters (hypertrophy), and cold exposure is not necessary for this muscle development to occur. Ptarmigan also have thick plumage with feather barbules that contain air-filled cavities, contributing to a low heat loss, which aids in thermoregulation while the bird is roosting in burrows in the snow. Ptarmigan can withstand the severe cold because the ambient temperature in the sheltered microclimate of their snow burrows typically exceeds their lower critical temperature.

Status
Widespread and not uncommon in its remote habitat, the willow ptarmigan is classified as a species of "Least Concern" by the IUCN. This is because, even if, as is suspected, numbers are declining slightly, it has a very wide range with a total population estimated at forty million individuals.

Title bird

The willow ptarmigan was adopted as the state bird of Alaska in 1955. It is also the regional bird of Southern Lapland.

See also
 Chicken, Alaska was originally going to be named "ptarmigan" in 1902, but town founders could not agree on how to spell it.

References

External links 

Game & Wildlife Conservation Trust Red Grouse Page
RSPB Red Grouse Page
Video clip of male Willow Ptarmigan in winter
Stamps: Willow Ptarmigan (for Belarus, Canada, Finland, Ireland, United States) with worldwide RangeMap
Willow Ptarmigan videos on the Internet Bird Collection
Willow Ptarmigan photo gallery VIREO

willow ptarmigan
Grouse
Holarctic birds
willow ptarmigan
willow ptarmigan
Symbols of Alaska